Julian Wilson (born 8 November 1988) is an Australian professional surfer who competes on the World Surf League Men's World Tour.

Personal life 
Wilson was born and raised in Coolum Beach, Queensland.
He is an ambassador for the National Breast Cancer Foundation.
Wilson's mother is a breast cancer survivor, and he was inspired to ride a pink board by a close family friend and international cricketer, Matthew Hayden, who plays with a pink bat for the corresponding cause.

Wilson was in the water during the final of the  J-Bay Open 2015 in South Africa when three-time world champion Mick Fanning was attacked by a great white shark. He paddled toward Fanning to assist, was praised for his action, and was subsequently hailed as a hero. The event was cancelled. Both surfers escaped unharmed and gifted a shared second-place result. Following the ordeal, Wilson gave a tear-filled interview, and when asked, "You guys are locked in a title battle right now, and to put things into perspective, does that mean anything to you at this point?" he replied, "No, not at all, I'm just happy he's alive."

Surfing career
2011 Accomplishments:
Ranked #9 on the 2011 ASP World Tour
Rookie of the Year 2011

2012 Accomplishments:
Won first ASP World Tour event – Rip Curl Pro Portugal (Peniche, Portugal)
Ranked #9 on the 2012 ASP World Tour rankings
Wilson then won the Hawaii Billabong Pipeline Master in 2014, the Billabong Pro Teahupoo in Tahiti in 2017, the Quiksilver Pro Gold Coast in 2018, and the Quiksilver Pro France in 2018.

Wilson qualified for the Tokyo 2020 Olympics. He lost to Gabriel Medina from Brazil in the third round of the men's shortboard. Australia at the 2020 Summer Olympics details the results in depth.

Career victories

References

1988 births
Living people
World Surf League surfers
Australian surfers
People from the Sunshine Coast, Queensland
Olympic surfers of Australia
Surfers at the 2020 Summer Olympics